The following is a list of Tamil-language magazines published across the world.

India

See also
Lists of Tamil-language media

References

Tamil
Tamil